Toimi Johannes Pitkänen (23 May 1928 – 17 September 2016) was a Finnish rower. He competed in various two-man and four man events at the 1952, 1956, 1960 and 1964 Olympics and won two bronze medals, in 1956 and 1960. Throughout most of his career Pitkänen rowed with Veli Lehtelä. In addition to two Olympic bronze medals, they won two gold and two silver medals at the European championships in 1955–1961, and  placed sixth at the 1964 Olympics.

References

1928 births
2016 deaths
Finnish male rowers
Olympic rowers of Finland
Rowers at the 1952 Summer Olympics
Rowers at the 1956 Summer Olympics
Rowers at the 1960 Summer Olympics
Rowers at the 1964 Summer Olympics
Olympic bronze medalists for Finland
Olympic medalists in rowing
Medalists at the 1960 Summer Olympics
Medalists at the 1956 Summer Olympics
European Rowing Championships medalists